Janet Elizabeth Jesudason  (born 15 December 1936) is a Singaporean former sprinter. She competed in the women's 100 metres at the 1956 Summer Olympics.

References

External links
 

1936 births
Living people
Athletes (track and field) at the 1956 Summer Olympics
Singaporean female sprinters
Olympic athletes of Singapore
Place of birth missing (living people)
Olympic female sprinters
20th-century Singaporean women